Callulops sagittatus is a species of frog in the family Microhylidae.
It is found in Papua New Guinea and possibly Indonesia.
Its natural habitat is subtropical or tropical moist montane forests.
It is threatened by habitat loss.

References

Sources

Callulops
Amphibians of Papua New Guinea
Taxonomy articles created by Polbot
Amphibians described in 1995